The Ǣgis; or, Independent weekly expositor was a short-lived London-based weekly newspaper, published from July 3 to at least 18 September 1818. Francis Perceval Eliot (1755–1818) was writing for it at the time of his death.

Copies of the newspaper are held at the British Library.

References

Defunct newspapers published in the United Kingdom
Defunct weekly newspapers
Publications established in 1818
Publications disestablished in 1818
1818 establishments in England